Āulu is a Hawaiian name for several species of tree found in mesic forests:

 Pisonia sandwicensis, a four o'clock
 Pouteria sandwicensis (also ʻĀlaʻa / ʻĒlaʻa), a sapote
 Sapindus oahuensis (also Lonomea), a soapberry